A Bigger Interior with Blue Terrace and Garden 2017 is a painting by British artist David Hockney. Hockney completed the painting in 2017 and it is seen as one of his more famous contemporary works. It is 48 x 96 inches (hexagonal) and was made using acrylic paint.

References

External links
 A Bigger Interior with Blue Terrace and Garden 2017 at thedavidhockneyfoundation.org

Paintings by David Hockney
2017 paintings